Caladenia hiemalis, commonly known as the dwarf common spider orchid is a species of orchid endemic to the south-west of Western Australia. It has a single, hairy leaf and one or two, cream-coloured flowers with a small, red-striped labellum. It has an early flowering period and its flowering is stimulated by summer fires.

Description
The flowers are cream-coloured with red markings and the sepals and petals have long, thread-like tips. The lateral sepals are about the same size as the dorsal sepal but curve stiffly downwards. The sides of the labellum have short teeth and the tip of the labellum is curled under. There are two rows of six to twelve cream-coloured, anvil-shaped calli with red markings along the centre of the labellum. Flowering occurs from June to early August, often following bushfires the previous summer.

Taxonomy and naming
Caladenia hiemalis was first described in 2001 by Stephen Hopper and Andrew Phillip Brown from a specimen collected in the Gooseberry Hill National Park and the description was published in Nuytsia. The specific epithet (hiemalis) is a Latin word meaning "of winter" or "wintry" referring to the flowering period of this orchid.

Distribution and habitat
Dwarf common spider orchid occurs between Jurien Bay and Tenterden in the Avon Wheatbelt, Esperance Plains and Jarrah Forest biogeographic regions where it usually grows in wandoo woodland, usually in moist soil.

Conservation
Caladenia hiemalis  is classified as "not threatened" by the Government of Western Australia Department of Parks and Wildlife.

References

hiemalis
Orchids of Western Australia
Endemic orchids of Australia
Plants described in 2001
Endemic flora of Western Australia
Taxa named by Stephen Hopper
Taxa named by Andrew Phillip Brown